Bohdan Oleksandrovych Hora (born 3 November 2002) is a Ukrainian professional footballer who plays as a left winger for Ukrainian First League club Mariupol.

References

External links
 
 

2002 births
Living people
Sportspeople from Kropyvnytskyi
Ukrainian footballers
Association football forwards
SC Dnipro-1 players
FC Nikopol players
FC Yarud Mariupol players
Ukrainian First League players
Ukrainian Second League players